The Institute of Creative Photography (ITF), also referred as Opava School of Photography, is the largest post-secondary school of photography in the Czech Republic. It is part of Silesian University (Opava). It currently has more than 200 students from the Czech Republic, Slovakia, Poland, Germany, Italy, Russia, Ukraine and other countries, in BA, MA, and PhD programmes, taught by nine core teachers (Vladimír Birgus – the Head of the ITF, Pavel Mára, Josef Moucha, Dita Pepe, Václav Podestát, Karel Poneš, Tomáš Pospěch, Jiří Siostrzonek, Jindřich Štreit) and seven external teachers.

The system of study at the ITF includes mail assessment of practical exercises assigned by the experienced teachers. The students can also take part in a number of workshops and long-term photography projects. The Bachelor‘s degree of Creative Photography at the ICP is very universal, and besides the most stressed individual creative activities, it includes practical exercises in all the main areas of artistic, documentary photography, press photography and applied photography as well as lectures in the history and theory of photography, photography criticism, the fine arts, psychology, sociology and other theoretical subjects. Only the graduates of the bachelor course are accepted to the Master‘s degree of Creative Photography. According to their focus they can choose optional subjects about artistic, documentary and applied photography. The graduates get a complete university qualification in all domains of photography as well as history and theory of photography, and are prepared for tasks of their profession and their own photography creation. A number of graduates undertake a career of independent photographers, press photographers, teachers at schools of photography, curators and photography critics and theoreticians.

The ITF prepares photography expositions of students‘ works and also of prominent Czech and foreign photographers. The expositions of the ICP students are held in exhibition halls in the Czech Republic but also abroad (i.e. in Opava, Ostrava, Prague, Brno, Zlín, Prostějov, Bratislava, Poznań, Katowice, Vilnius, Kaunas, Würzburg, Bombay and other cities).

Selected Graduates 
 Krzysztof Gołuch: 1st Prize, Breaking Stereotypes, European Union photography competition, Brussels, 2007
 Lucia Nimcová: winner, Leica Oskar Barnack Award, 2008
 Tereza Vlčková: Grand Prix BMW, Lyon Septembre de la photographie, Lyon, 2008
 Lucia Nimcová: Central European Bank Photography Award, Frankfurt am Main, 2008
 Bára Prášilová: finalist, Hasselblad Masters, in the Fashion/Beauty category, 2009
 Tomasz Wiech: 3rd Prize, World Press Photo, in the Everyday Life category, Amsterdam, 2009
 Bára Prášilová: Photographer of the Year, Czech Grand Design Awards, Prague, 2009 and 2011
 Andrej Balco: 1st Prize, Fresh M.I.L.K. Photography Competition, Auckland, 2009
 Anna Orlowska, Tereza Vlčková, Barbora Žůrková & Radim Žůrek: finalists, reGeneration 2 / Tomorrow’s Photographers Today, Musée de l’Elysée, Lausanne, 2010 
 Tomasz Wiech: finalist, Leica Oskar Barnack Award, 2011
 Rafał Milach: finalist, Paris Photo/Aperture Photo Book Award, New York City and Paris, 2012 
 Tomasz Lazar: 2nd Prize, World Press Photo, in the People in the News category, Amsterdam, 2012
 Bára Prášilová: finalist, New York Photo Awards, 2012
 Jan Brykczyński: winner, Syngenta Photography Award, London, 2013
 Roman Vondrouš: 1st Prize, World Press Photo, in the Sport category, Amsterdam, 2013

References 
Recenze výstavy „Dvacátý rok Institutu tvůrčí fotografie FPF Slezské univerzity v Opavě (Review of the exposition "20th Anniversary of the Institute of Creative Photography"), Fotografovani, April 19, 2010

Further reading
Věra Matějů, "Institut tvůrčí fotografie", Fotografie–Magazín,  1/1995
Vojtěch Bartek, "První magistři ITF vystavují v indické Bombaji", Noviny Slezské univerzity, 12/1999

External links

 Institut tvůrčí fotografie - fanpage on Facebook
 Slezská univerzita v Opavě - official site of Silesian University (Opava)

Art schools in the Czech Republic
Photography in the Czech Republic